The district courts of Russia ( or ; also called  or  courts) are primarily courts of first instance in the judiciary of Russia but sometimes hear appeals from magistrates' courts. Decisions of the court are appealed to the regional court.

As courts of first instance, they handle criminal cases where imprisonment is for more than 3 years, and consist of 1 judge and a jury where required. As courts of appeal from decisions of the magistrate courts consisting of 1 justice of the peace, they consist of 1 judge and retry the case.

They were called People's Courts until 1996.

See also
 Raion
 Magistrates' court (Russia)

References

 

Judiciary of Russia
Districts of Russia by federal subject